Sándor Csató (born 1 July 1965) is a Hungarian football coach and a former midfielder.

Managerial career
On 2 September 2020 he was appointed as the manager of the Nemzeti Bajnokság II club Győri ETO FC.

References

1965 births
Living people
Hungarian footballers
Szolnoki MÁV FC footballers
Békéscsaba 1912 Előre footballers
Mikkelin Palloilijat players
Győri ETO FC players
Fehérvár FC players
Association football midfielders
Hungarian expatriate footballers
Expatriate footballers in Finland
Hungarian expatriate sportspeople in Finland
Hungarian football managers
Békéscsaba 1912 Előre managers
Zalaegerszegi TE managers
Győri ETO FC managers
People from Szolnok
Sportspeople from Jász-Nagykun-Szolnok County
Dunaújváros FC managers